The 1993 Spanish general election was held on Sunday, 6 June 1993, to elect the 5th Cortes Generales of the Kingdom of Spain. All 350 seats in the Congress of Deputies were up for election, as well as 208 of 256 seats in the Senate.

The Spanish Socialist Workers' Party under Felipe González achieved the largest number of votes and seats for the fourth consecutive time, though it lost the absolute majority it had held in both chambers of the Cortes since 1982. In contrast, José María Aznar's People's Party won a large share of the vote, thus increasing their seats in both the Congress and the Senate and consolidating its position as the main opposition party. For the first time since 1979, the election brought in a hung parliament, forcing the governing PSOE to seek the support of nationalist groups in order to renew its mandate and secure a fourth term in government.

In the aftermath of the election, the PSOE saw itself under increased pressure due both to political instability as a result of its low majority (relying on increasingly unstable pacts with Convergence and Union to pass its legislation) and of the uncovering of numerous cases of corruption within the government itself. The pact with CiU would end in the fall of 1995, forcing González to call early elections 15 months before their scheduled date, which would see the opposition People's Party win for the first time.

Overview

Electoral system
The Spanish Cortes Generales were envisaged as an imperfect bicameral system. The Congress of Deputies had greater legislative power than the Senate, having the ability to vote confidence in or withdraw it from a prime minister and to override Senate vetoes by an absolute majority of votes. Nonetheless, the Senate possessed a few exclusive (yet limited in number) functions—such as its role in constitutional amendment—which were not subject to the Congress' override. Voting for the Cortes Generales was on the basis of universal suffrage, which comprised all nationals over 18 years of age and in full enjoyment of their political rights.

For the Congress of Deputies, 348 seats were elected using the D'Hondt method and a closed list proportional representation, with an electoral threshold of three percent of valid votes—which included blank ballots—being applied in each constituency. Seats were allocated to constituencies, corresponding to the provinces of Spain, with each being allocated an initial minimum of two seats and the remaining 248 being distributed in proportion to their populations. Ceuta and Melilla were allocated the two remaining seats, which were elected using plurality voting. The use of the D'Hondt method might result in a higher effective threshold, depending on the district magnitude.

As a result of the aforementioned allocation, each Congress multi-member constituency was entitled the following seats:

For the Senate, 208 seats were elected using an open list partial block voting system, with electors voting for individual candidates instead of parties. In constituencies electing four seats, electors could vote for up to three candidates; in those with two or three seats, for up to two candidates; and for one candidate in single-member districts. Each of the 47 peninsular provinces was allocated four seats, whereas for insular provinces, such as the Balearic and Canary Islands, districts were the islands themselves, with the larger—Majorca, Gran Canaria and Tenerife—being allocated three seats each, and the smaller—Menorca, Ibiza–Formentera, Fuerteventura, La Gomera, El Hierro, Lanzarote and La Palma—one each. Ceuta and Melilla elected two seats each. Additionally, autonomous communities could appoint at least one senator each and were entitled to one additional senator per each million inhabitants.

Election date
The term of each chamber of the Cortes Generales—the Congress and the Senate—expired four years from the date of their previous election, unless they were dissolved earlier. The election decree was required to be issued no later than the twenty-fifth day prior to the date of expiry of the Cortes in the event that the prime minister did not make use of his prerogative of early dissolution. The decree was to be published on the following day in the Official State Gazette (BOE), with election day taking place between the fifty-fourth and the sixtieth day from publication. The previous election was held on 29 October 1989, which meant that the legislature's term would expire on 29 October 1993. The election decree was required to be published in the BOE no later than 5 October 1993, with the election taking place on the sixtieth day from publication, setting the latest possible election date for the Cortes Generales on Saturday, 4 December 1993.

The prime minister had the prerogative to dissolve both chambers at any given time—either jointly or separately—and call a snap election, provided that no motion of no confidence was in process, no state of emergency was in force and that dissolution did not occur before one year had elapsed since the previous one. Additionally, both chambers were to be dissolved and a new election called if an investiture process failed to elect a prime minister within a two-month period from the first ballot. Barred this exception, there was no constitutional requirement for simultaneous elections for the Congress and the Senate. Still, as of  there has been no precedent of separate elections taking place under the 1978 Constitution.

Parliamentary composition
The Cortes Generales were officially dissolved on 13 April 1993, after the publication of the dissolution decree in the Official State Gazette. The tables below show the composition of the parliamentary groups in both chambers at the time of dissolution.

Parties and candidates
The electoral law allowed for parties and federations registered in the interior ministry, coalitions and groupings of electors to present lists of candidates. Parties and federations intending to form a coalition ahead of an election were required to inform the relevant Electoral Commission within ten days of the election call, whereas groupings of electors needed to secure the signature of at least one percent of the electorate in the constituencies for which they sought election, disallowing electors from signing for more than one list of candidates.

Below is a list of the main parties and electoral alliances which contested the election:

Opinion polls

Campaign

Election debates

Opinion polls

Results

Congress of Deputies

Senate

Aftermath

Notes

References

General
1993 in Spain
1993
June 1993 events in Europe